Amjad Adaileh MVO is a Jordanian politician specialising in news media and communications. He is the current Ambassador of Jordan to Egypt. Born in 1962 in Kerak, south of Jordan, where he finished High School.

Education and career 
Adaileh graduated from Yarmouk University in 1984 with a B.A. Media Editing and Production. He started his career working for the Ministry of Information in 1987. He soon moved to working for the Royal Hashemite Court's Department of Public Relations in 1992.

At the Court, Adaileh served as the director of Arabic Media (2000–2006) and the director general of Media and Communications (2006–2008). He was appointed in February 2011 as the media and communications advisor to King Abdullah II of Jordan.

On 25 September 2007 Adaileh was promoted to the rank of minister in the Royal Hashemite Court by royal decree.

In 2012, Adalieh was appointed as the ambassador of Jordan to Turkey and as an unresidenced ambassador to Macedonia and Turkmenistan.
In 2017, Adaileh was appointed as the ambassador of Jordan to Russia.
In 2019, Adaileh was appointed as the Jordanian Minister of State for Media Affairs.

In November 2020, Adaileh was appointed Ambassador of Jordan to Egypt.

Family 
Amjad Adaileh is married and has 4 children, 2 girls and 2 boys (Nadine, Ghassan, Mohammad and Raya).

Memberships 
 Member of the board of trustees of the Royal Jordanian Hashemite Documentation Centre (2008–present)
 Member of the board of trustees of Jadara University (2008–present)
 University of Jordan Centre for Strategic Studies board of trustees (2007–present)
 University of Jordan Medical College board (2006–2007)
 Member of Jordan First Royal Commission (October 2002)

Decorations, awards and honors 
 Jordanian Independence Medal of the 1st Order (Jordan, 2003) – awarded by King Abdullah II
 Jordanian Independence Medal of the 2nd Order (Jordan, 2001) – awarded by King Abdullah II
 Grand Officer of the Order of Orange-Nassau (Netherlands, 2006) – awarded by Queen Beatrix
 Knight Commander of the Royal Order of the Polar Star (Sweden, 2003) – awarded by Carl XVI Gustaf
 Commander's Cross of the Order of Merit of the Federal Republic of Germany (Germany, 2002) – awarded by Chancellor Gerhardt Schroeder
 Commander of the Order of Merit of the Republic of Italy (Italy, 2001) – awarded by President Carlo Azeglio Ciampi
 Honorary Lieutenant of the Royal Victorian Order (United Kingdom, 2001) – awarded by Queen Elizabeth II
 Commander of the Royal Norwegian Order of Merit (Norway, 2000) – awarded by King Harold V
 Order of the Sacred Treasure (Japan, 1999) – awarded by Emperor Akihito
 Commander of the Ordre national du Mérite (France, 2000) – awarded by President Jacques Chirac
 Officer's Cross of the Order of Isabella the Catholic (Spain, 1999) – awarded by King Juan Carlos
 Knight 4th Class Officer of the Order of Orange-Nassau (Netherlands, 1994) – awarded by Queen Beatrix
 Knight's Cross of the Order of Civil Merit (Spain, 1994) – awarded by King Juan Carlos

References 

 
 Jordanian Prime Ministry
 https://jordantimes.com/news/local/cabinet-sees-nine-new-ministers-royal-decree-approves-reshuffle

Living people
1962 births
People from Al Karak
Yarmouk University alumni
Academic staff of the University of Jordan
Academic staff of Jadara University
Government ministers of Jordan
Grand Officers of the Order of Orange-Nassau
Knights of the Order of Orange-Nassau
Knights of the Order of the Polar Star
Commanders Crosses of the Order of Merit of the Federal Republic of Germany
Honorary Members of the Royal Victorian Order
Recipients of the Order of the Sacred Treasure
Commanders of the Ordre national du Mérite
Recipients of the Order of Isabella the Catholic
Grand Cross of the Order of Civil Merit
Ambassadors of Jordan to Turkey